Scott Beaulier is an American economist and academic administrator who is Dean of Business and Professor of Economics for the University of Wyoming's College of Business. He was previously Dean of North Dakota State University's College of Business. Earlier in his career, he served as Executive Director at the Center for the Study of Economic Liberty in the W. P. Carey School of Business at Arizona State University, Executive Director of the Manuel H. Johnson Center for Political Economy and Chair of Economics & Finance at Troy University, and as a Department Chair of Economics at Mercer University.

Early life and education 
A first-generation college student, Beaulier was born and raised in Iron Mountain, Michigan, hometown of Tom Izzo and Steve Mariucci. 

He attended Northern Michigan University in Marquette, Michigan and became interested in economics when he took a course taught by David Prychitko.   After completing a B.A. (2000) in economics and history at NMU, Beaulier attended George Mason University where he earned an M.A. and a Ph.D. (2000) in economics. His dissertation focused on economic development and the role robust institutions play in human flourishing and was supervised by Peter Boettke.

Career 
After receiving his doctoral degree, Beaulier taught at several institutions, including Mercer University, Beloit College, Troy University, and Arizona State University. In 2016, he became one of America's youngest business deans when he joined North Dakota State University as Dean of the College of Business and Professor of Economics. In his six years at NDSU, Beaulier led the College of Business through two AACSB accreditation reviews, secured historic philanthropic support for the College of Business,  and helped to launch the Sheila & Robert Challey Institute for Global Innovation and Growth, which was the largest investment in people--faculty and students--in NDSU history. In 2019, Beaulier became the first named dean in NDSU history when he assumed the role of the Ronald & Kaye Olson Dean of Business. In July, 2022, Beaulier left NDSU after six years as Dean of Business to assume the role of Dean of Business at the University of Wyoming in Laramie, Wyoming. 

In addition to his academic positions, he is a volunteer for AACSB and has evaluated a number of other business schools and colleges for accreditation. For 10 years, he served as a Board Member for the Institute for Humane Studies, and in addition to this work, he has been an active board member of many community and nonprofit organizations.

Personal life 
An avid runner, Beaulier has run more than 15 marathons, including the Boston Marathon on three different occasions. His wife, Anemone Beaulier, is an accomplished writer and poet, and together they are raising four children in Laramie, Wyoming.

References

External links
 

Living people
21st-century American economists
Economics educators
Northern Michigan University alumni
George Mason University alumni
University of Wyoming faculty
American university and college faculty deans
Year of birth missing (living people)